Juventud Alegre Futbol Club  is a Salvadoran professional football club based in Quezaltepeque, El Salvador.

The club is currently playing in the Tercera Division de Fútbol Salvadoreño.

History
The club has played under the name Juventud Candelareña in the past.

Coaches
 Nelson Mauricio Ancheta (1994)
 Jorge Abrego (2002)

Juventud Alegre